Lieutenant General (Retired) Daniel P. "Fig" Leaf was Deputy Commander and Acting Commander, United States Pacific Command, Camp H. M. Smith, Hawaii.

Military career 
A native of Shawano, Wisconsin, General Leaf earned his commission as a distinguished graduate of the University of Wisconsin–Madison Air Force ROTC program in 1974. He commanded a flight, two squadrons, an operations group and two fighter wings, and has directed joint operations.

In 1995, LtGen Leaf served as the J-3 for Joint Task Force-Southwest Asia and flew the F-15C over Southern Iraq, enforcing U.N. sanctions on the Saddam Hussein regime. He deployed to Incirlik Air Base, Turkey, with one of his 20th Fighter Wing squadrons in 1998 and flew the F-16CJ on Operation Northern Watch suppression of enemy air defense missions over Northern Iraq. During Operation Allied Force, LtGen Leaf commanded the 31st Air Expeditionary Wing, which included F-16CG, F-16CJ, F-15E, F-117A, A-10A and EC-130 aircraft squadrons. He flew and led F-16CG day and night combat missions against fixed and mobile targets in Serbia and Kosovo. During Operation Iraqi Freedom, he served as the Director, Air Component Coordination Element with the Coalition Land Forces Component Commander in Kuwait and Iraq. In that role, he served as the Air Component Commander's direct representative to the Land Commander during planning and initial major combat operations.

Prior to this assignment, General Leaf was the Vice Commander of Air Force Space Command, Peterson Air Force Base, Colorado. Other staff assignments include duty as the Air Force's Director of Operational Requirements and the Deputy J-3, U.S. Forces-Korea.

Post-military career 
Lt Gen Leaf retired from the U.S. Air Force in 2008 after more than 33 years of service. He worked for Northrop Grumman Information Systems as the Vice President, Strategic Initiatives, from September 2008 to January 2012. He returned to government service as the Director of the Asia-Pacific Center for Security Studies (APCSS) in January 2012. In 2015, the center was renamed the Daniel K. Inouye Asia-Pacific Center for Security Studies (DKI APCSS).  After five years at DKI APCSS, he left to start Phase Minus 1, LLC. He also serves as the Executive Director for Indo-Asia Pacific Operations for CyberSpace Operations Consulting, Inc.

Education

Military Assignments 
December 1974 - November 1975, student, pilot training, Columbus AFB, Mississippi
March 1976 - November 1976, student, F-4D initial training, George AFB, California
November 1976 - April 1978, F-4D aircraft commander, flight lead and standardization and evaluation officer, 7th and 9th Tactical Fighter Squadrons, Holloman AFB, New Mexico
May 1978 - August 1978, student, OV-10 training, Patrick AFB, Florida
August 1978 - April 1980, OV-10 forward air controller, 19th Tactical Air Support Squadron; instructor pilot and flight examiner, 51st Composite Group; later, Chief, and standardization and evaluation officer, 5th Tactical Group, Osan Air Base, South Korea
April 1980 - July 1981, weapons system project officer and standardization and evaluation flight examiner, Headquarters Pacific Air Forces, Hickam AFB, Hawaii
July 1981 - June 1985, F-15C pilot, instructor pilot, Chief of Training and Scheduling, and flight commander, 44th Tactical Fighter Squadron, later, standardization and evaluation branch chief, 18th Tactical Fighter Wing, Kadena AB, Japan
June 1985 - May 1988, student, later, faculty member, Army Command and General Staff College, Fort Leavenworth, Kansas
May 1988 - May 1992, F-15 instructor pilot, Chief of Standardization and Evaluation, and operations officer, 426th Tactical Fighter Training Squadron, later, Commander, 555th Tactical Fighter Training Squadron, later, Commander, 58th Operations Support Squadron, Luke AFB, Ariz.
June 1992 - June 1993, Air Combat Command-sponsored research fellow and student, Air War College, Maxwell AFB, Alabama
July 1993 - July 1995, Deputy Commander, later, Commander, 1st Operations Group, Langley AFB, Virginia
March 1995 - June 1995, J-3, Joint Task Force Southwest Asia, Riyadh, Saudi Arabia
July 1995 - June 1997, Deputy J-3, U.S. Forces Korea, and Assistant Deputy C-3, Republic of Korea/U.S. Combined Forces Command, Yongsan, South Korea
July 1997 - November 1998, Commander, 20th Fighter Wing, Shaw AFB, South Carolina
November 1998 - January 2000, Commander, 31st Fighter Wing and 31st Air Expeditionary Wing, Aviano AB, Italy
January 2000 - November 2002, Director of Operational Requirements, Deputy Chief of Staff for Air and Space Operations, Headquarters U.S. Air Force, Washington, D.C.
December 2002 - July 2003, Director of Operational Capability Requirements, Deputy Chief of Staff for Air and Space Operations, Headquarters U.S. Air Force, Washington, D.C. (February 2003 - April 2003, Director, U.S. Central Command Air Forces Air Component Coordination Element, Coalition Land Forces Component Headquarters, Camp Doha, Kuwait)
August 2003 - September 2005, Vice Commander, Air Force Space Command, Peterson AFB, Colorado
October 2005 - April 2008, Deputy Commander, U.S. Pacific Command, Camp H.M. Smith, Hawaii

Flight information

Awards and decorations

Other achievements

Effective dates of promotion

Publications

References 

 
 

Year of birth missing (living people)
Living people
United States Air Force personnel of the Iraq War
Military personnel from Wisconsin
People from Shawano, Wisconsin
Recipients of the Legion of Merit
United States Air Force generals
Recipients of the Air Medal
United States Army Command and General Staff College alumni
University of Wisconsin–Madison alumni
Recipients of the Defense Superior Service Medal
Recipients of the Defense Distinguished Service Medal
Recipients of the Air Force Distinguished Service Medal